Mohamed Sheikh Hassan Hamud is a Somali politician. He is the former Chief of the Somali Police Force.

Career
Hassan hails from the Rahanweyn clan.

From January 2014 to January 2015, he served as the Minister of Defence of Somalia, having been named to the position by Prime Minister Abdiweli Sheikh Ahmed. Hassan was succeeded at the office by Abdulkadir Sheikh Dini, who was appointed by new Prime Minister Omar Abdirashid Ali Sharmarke.

On 20 April 2015, Hassan was appointed the new Chief of the Somali Police Force by Prime Minister Omar Abdirashid Ali Sharmarke. He succeeded Osman Omar Wehliye at the position, who had served as interim Police Commissioner after the death of Mohamed Sheikh Ismail.

References

Living people
Defence Ministers of Somalia
Government ministers of Somalia
Year of birth missing (living people)